The Silver Cord is a 2008 album by The Classic Crime.

The Silver Cord may also refer to:

 The Silver Cord (film), a 1933 American film directed by John Cromwell
 The Silver Cord, a 1926 play by Sidney Howard, basis for the film
 Silver cord, a concept in metaphysical studies and literature
 Silvercord, a shopping centre and office complex in Hong Kong
 The Silver Cord, a song by french metal band Gojira